The North Moccasin Mountains,  el. , is a small mountain range northwest of Hilger, Montana in Fergus County, Montana.

See also 
 List of mountain ranges in Montana

Notes 

Mountain ranges of Montana
Landforms of Fergus County, Montana